Anshai Lal is an Indian Hindi film Director and Producer. He made his directorial debut with Phillauri, starring Anushka Sharma, Diljit Dosanjh, Suraj Sharma, Mehreen Pirzada, which released worldwide on 24 March 2017. The movie was produced by Clean Slate Films and Fox Star Studios. His work as a Director And Executive Producer includes Mai (2022), starring Sakshi Tanwar, a highly acclaimed Netflix show.
He is also the creative producer on the feature films Bulbbul (2020) and Qala (2022)

Career
Anshai Lal was always interested in creative arts from a very young age and was actively involved in the dramatics society of his school. This love for arts and driven by his passion for films , he decided to shift to Mumbai in early 2005 right after his graduation where he started his career as an assistant director to Saket Chaudhary for the box office success Pyaar Ke Side Effects (2006), followed by Shimit Amin for the Indian sports film Chak De! India (2007). Anshai has also assisted for Dostana (2008), Housefull (2010) and Himmatwala (2013).

Anshai made his debut as a director with Phillauri, a romantic comedy set in Phillaur, Punjab. The film released worldwide on 24 March 2017.

Anshai Lal is also the Creative Producer on Bulbbul (2020) and Qala (2020), both highly critically acclaimed feature films were directed by Anvita Dutt.

His next venture as a Director and Executive Producer was Mai (2022), produced by Clean slate Films.

Anshai is currently shooting a hindi feature film "Afghaani Snow", an action thriller, starring Vijay Vamra and Tripti Dimri ,which is slated to release in early 2024

Personal life
Anshai was born and brought up in New Delhi where he completed his schooling from Delhi Public School, Mathura Road and graduation in Bachelors of Journalism and Mass Communication from Indraprastha University.

Filmography

As director

As Executive Producer

As Creative Producer

Bulbbul (2020) Bulbbul

QALA (2022) Qala

As Assistant Director

References

External links

 

Film directors from Delhi
Hindi-language film directors
Living people
People from New Delhi
21st-century Indian film directors
Year of birth missing (living people)